Jorge Lucar Figueroa (born 6 January 1934) was a Chilean Army general and member of the Government Junta that ruled Chile from 1973–1990.  He served on the junta as a member from January 2 to March 11, 1990.

References

Living people
Chilean Army generals
1934 births
20th-century Chilean military personnel